The Laohua Mosque is a mosque in Linxia City, Linxia Hui Autonomous Prefecture, Gansu Province, China.

History
The mosque was built in 1368.

Architecture
The mosque is built with Chinese-style architectural style for its roof.

See also
 Islam in China
 List of mosques in China

References

1368 establishments in Asia
14th-century establishments in China
14th-century mosques
Linxia Hui Autonomous Prefecture
Mosques in Gansu
Religious buildings and structures completed in 1368